12 Wasted Years is a video documentary of heavy metal band Iron Maiden, focusing on the history of the band from 1975 to 1987. It includes several rare videos and interviews from the band's career, some of which were later included on the 2004 documentary The Early Days.

The video was released on laserdisc and VHS tape.

In March 2013, Iron Maiden included the full documentary in a reissue of their 1989 concert film, Maiden England.

Reception

AllMusic describes it as a "highly recommended documentary".

Track List

Additional Tracks

Certifications

References

British documentary films
Iron Maiden video albums
1987 video albums
Live video albums
Documentary films about heavy metal music and musicians
Picture Music International video albums